The Pine Tree in the Mountain (U gori raste zelen bor) is a Yugoslav film directed by Antun Vrdoljak. Set during World War II the film follows the exploits of a brigade of partisans, concentrating on the differences between a communist party commissioner and the brigade commander. It was released in 1971.

References

External links
 

1971 films
1971 war films
Yugoslav war films
Croatian war films
Serbo-Croatian-language films
Films based on non-fiction books
Films directed by Antun Vrdoljak
Jadran Film films
Films set in Yugoslavia
War films set in Partisan Yugoslavia
Yugoslav World War II films
Croatian World War II films